Sui Gas Pipeline in Pakistan may refer to:

 Sui Northern Gas Pipelines Limited
 Sui Southern Gas Company

See also
 Sui gas field
 Sui, Balochistan
 Military College Sui
 Sui Airport